

Gustav Adolf Karl Friedrich Ernst von Zangen (7 November 1892 – 1 May 1964) was a German general in the Wehrmacht during World War II and a commander of the 15th Army in the Netherlands in 1944 during World War II. He was a recipient of the Knight's Cross of the Iron Cross with Oak Leaves of Nazi Germany.

Career 
Born in 1892, Von Zangen joined the army and served during World War I, receiving the Iron Cross.

During World War II, he commanded the 17th Infantry Division on the Eastern Front, a Corps in France in 1943 and an Army detachment in Italy before being appointed to command the 15th Army on the Western Front. Having occupied the Pas de Calais during the 1944 campaign in France, Von Zangen was forced to evacuate his army, together with other divisions, across the Scheldt to the island of Walcheren and South Beveland.

There, they were attacked during the Battle of the Scheldt 2 October-8 November 1944. He deployed his force against the Allied advance into the Netherlands. On 24 October 1944 his headquarters in Dordrecht were bombed by the RAF. During the Ardennes offensive starting 16 December 1944, his 15th Army was tasked with fixing the British and U.S. forces north of the Bulge (see also Operation Blackcock, Operation Grenade.) Von Zangen surrendered in April 1945 in the Ruhr Pocket.

He died in 1964 in Hanau.

Awards and decorations
 Iron Cross (1914) 2nd Class (13 September 1914) & 1st Class (19 March 1915)
 EK II: 13 September 1914
 EK I: 19 March 1915
 General Honor Decoration (Hesse)
 Großherzoglich Hessisches Kriegsehrenzeichen in Eisen
 Wound Badge (1914) in Black
 Rechtsritter of the Order of Saint John (Bailiwick of Brandenburg)
 Honour Cross of the World War 1914/1918
 Wehrmacht Long Service Award 4th to 1st Class
 West Wall Medal
 Clasp to the Iron Cross (2nd Class & 1st Class)
 Eastern Front Medal
 Knight's Cross of the Iron Cross with Oak Leaves
 Knight's Cross on 15 January 1942 as Oberst and commander of Infanterie-Regiment 88.
 647th Oak Leaves on 5 November 1944 as General der Infanterie and acting commander of the 15. Armee

References

Citations

Bibliography

 
 
 

1892 births
1964 deaths
Military personnel from Darmstadt
Generals of Infantry (Wehrmacht)
German Army  personnel of World War I
Recipients of the clasp to the Iron Cross, 1st class
People from the Grand Duchy of Hesse
Recipients of the Knight's Cross of the Iron Cross with Oak Leaves
German Army generals of World War II